Shamistan Alizamanli (born February 4, 1959) is a military speaker of the Republic of Azerbaijan, the author of patriotic songs, elocutionist and radio and television presenter.

Profile

Shamistan Alizamanli graduated from the Azerbaijan State University of Culture and Arts. He started to work as an announcer on Azerbaijani television and radio. Then he was sent to Moscow to continue his studies. He graduated and won the first prize in the Soviet Union by his talent as an announcer.

Music career

In 1993, he began his singing career. He interprets military and patriotic songs, such as "Brave soldier" ("İgid əsgər"), "Mr. Lieutenant" ("Cənab Leytenant"), "First battalion" ("Birinci batalyon"), "Falcons" ("Şahinlər") "Property of homeland" ("Vətən əmanəti") etc.

Albums

 Motherland is calling! ("Çağırır vətən")
 Property of homeland ("Vətən əmanəti")
 The Motherland ("Ana yurdum")

Music videos

 Give us the way Caucasus Mountains!! ("Qafqaz dağı yol ver bizə")
 Brave soldier ("Igid Əsgər")
 Worried Black Sea ("Çırpınırdı Qara dəniz")
 Gulistan ("Gülüstan")
 Either Karabakh or death ("Ya Qarabağ Ya Ölüm")

Filmography

These films were broadcast by voice Shamistan Alizamanli:

 "Strange people bring bad news" (Bəd xəbərlər gətirən qəribə adamlar) - film, 1993
 "Gudyalchay" (Qudyalçay) - film, 2001
 "Keroglu" (Koroğlu) - film, 2003
 "Great commanders" (Dahi sərkərdələr) - film, United Kingdom, 2003

See also
Chingiz Mustafayev
Azerbaijani folk music
Azerbaijani pop music

References

Military musicians
20th-century Azerbaijani male singers
Azerbaijani radio people
Azerbaijani television personalities
1959 births
Living people
People from Marneuli
Georgian Azerbaijanis
21st-century Azerbaijani male singers